Kevin Andre Dillard (born October 15, 1989) is an American professional basketball player for KK Gostivar of the Macedonian First League.

High school
Dillard attended and played high school basketball Homewood-Flossmoor High School, in Flossmoor, Illinois, where he was named the 2008 Illinois Mr. Basketball.

College career
After graduating from Homewood-Flossmoor High, Dillard played two years of college basketball for Southern Illinois University. After the 2009–10 season, Dillard transferred to Dayton. He had to sit out one season under NCAA rules. He was named to the All-Atlantic 10 Second Team, as a junior and senior.

College statistics

|-
| style="text-align:left;"| 2008–09
| style="text-align:left;"| Southern Illinois
| 31 || || 30.9 || .441 || .452 || .727 || 2.0 || 4.2 || 1.3 || 0.2 || 12.2
|-
| style="text-align:left;"| 2009–10
| style="text-align:left;"| Southern Illinois
| 29 ||  || 28.9 || .423 || .320 || .773 || 3.1 || 5.0 || 1.1 || 0.1 || 12.3
|-
| style="text-align:left;"| 2011–12
| style="text-align:left;"| Dayton Flyers
| 33 ||  || 32.7 || .412 || .325 || .827 || 2.7 || 6.0 || 1.4 || 0.4 || 13.3
|-
| style="text-align:left;"| 2012–13
| style="text-align:left;"| Dayton Flyers
| 31 ||  || 33.0 || .405 || .396 || .892 || 1.9 || 4.5 || 1.1 || 0.1 || 15.3

Professional career
Dillard failed to be drafted at the 2013 NBA draft. On August 7, 2013, he signed with A.S. Junior Casale of Italy, for the 2013–14 season.

On July 4, 2014, he signed with VEF Rīga of Latvia. On November 8, 2014, he parted ways with VEF Rīga. On December 8, 2014, he signed with Élan Béarnais Pau-Orthez of France, for the rest of the season.

On August 1, 2015, he signed with MHP Riesen Ludwigsburg of Germany, for the 2015–16 season. However, on September 4, 2015, he parted ways with Ludwigsburg, before appearing in a game for them.

On October 27, 2015, he signed with Cholet Basket of France. On November 25, 2015, he left Cholet, and signed with the Greek club Apollon Patras.
On April 2, 2016, he signed with the Belgian club Antwerp Giants, for the rest of the season.

On July 27, 2016, Dillard signed with Turkish club Pınar Karşıyaka. On December 4, 2016, he was excused from the team, with poor playing performance being cited as the reasons for the decision. In the wake of the falling out with his club, he did not re-join the team at all during the rest of December, while instead looking for another gig elsewhere.

On January 7, 2017, he signed with the New Zealand Breakers, for the rest of the 2016–17 NBL season. On February 22, 2017, he signed with Israeli club Maccabi Ashdod.

On July 8, 2017, Dillard signed with PAOK Thessaloniki of the Greek League. On November 4, 2017, he parted ways with PAOK. On January 18, 2018, he signed with Hungarian club EGIS Körmend.

On October 10, 2019, he has signed with Sigortam.net İTÜ BB of the Basketball Super League.  Dillard averaged 10 points and 5.6 assists per game. On July 27, 2020, he signed in Hungary with Soproni KC.

Dillard played one game for CS Dinamo București in 2021. On February 27, 2022, he signed with KK Gostivar of the Macedonian First League.

References

External links
Greek Basket League Profile 
Greek Basket League Profile 
Eurobasket.com profile
Dayton Flyers College Bio
New Breakers point guard Kevin Dillard feeling at home and ready to save season

Living people
1989 births
A.S. Junior Pallacanestro Casale players
American expatriate basketball people in Belgium
American expatriate basketball people in France
American expatriate basketball people in Greece
American expatriate basketball people in Hungary
American expatriate basketball people in Israel
American expatriate basketball people in Italy
American expatriate basketball people in Latvia
American expatriate basketball people in Romania
American expatriate basketball people in New Zealand
American expatriate basketball people in Turkey
American men's basketball players
Antwerp Giants players
Apollon Patras B.C. players
Basketball players from Illinois
BC Körmend players
BK VEF Rīga players
Cholet Basket players
Dayton Flyers men's basketball players
Élan Béarnais players
İstanbul Teknik Üniversitesi B.K. players
Karşıyaka basketball players
Maccabi Ashdod B.C. players
New Zealand Breakers players
P.A.O.K. BC players
People from Homewood, Illinois
Point guards
Southern Illinois Salukis men's basketball players
Sportspeople from Cook County, Illinois
Homewood-Flossmoor High School alumni